The Maison carrée d'Arlac is a neoclassical folly building constructed between 1785 and 1789, in the town of Mérignac just outside Bordeaux, France. It was built for Bordeaux banker Charles Peixotto.

References

Neoclassical architecture in France
Châteaux in Gironde
Folly buildings
1789 establishments in France
Buildings and structures completed in 1789
18th-century architecture in France